Milan Brown (born January 1971) is an American college basketball coach. He is currently an assistant coach for Pittsburgh. He was the head coach at Holy Cross until his firing on March 6, 2015. Prior to assuming this position in 2010, he succeeded Jim Phelan at Mount Saint Mary's University, who retired in 2003 after coaching for 49 years.

Brown graduated in 1993 from Howard University, playing basketball there for four years. Brown was a member of the Bison squad which made the school's last NCAA tournament in 1992.  His number was retired by the school in December 2005.

On March 12, 2008, Brown led the Mountaineers to the 2007–08 Northeast Conference Championship game where they were victorious, 68–55, over Sacred Heart University.  He led his team to a 69–60 victory over Coppin State University in the opening round of the 2008 NCAA Men's Division I Basketball Tournament.  The Mount lost 113–74 to the University of North Carolina in the first round.

Brown completed his sixth season as head coach with a 69–58 loss to James Madison University in the opening round of the 2009 CollegeInsider.com Tournament on March 18, 2009.

In Brown's final season at the Mount, he led the Mountaineers to a 16–15 overall record and 12–6 in the Northeast Conference, good for a third-place finish. After starting the season 5–14, the Mount ran off 11 consecutive victories, its longest streak since winning 15 straight in the 1995–96 season. His tenure ended at the Mount when they lost to Robert Morris University, 80–62, in the Northeast Conference semifinals.

He finished his time at the Mount with a record of 95–120, 68–58 in Northeast Conference play.

In 2010, during his tenure at Holy Cross, he became the first black member of the Worcester Country Club, having been sponsored by Holy Cross alumnus Bob Cousy.

Head coaching record

References

1971 births
Living people
American men's basketball players
Basketball coaches from Virginia
Basketball players from Virginia
College men's basketball head coaches in the United States
College of Charleston Cougars men's basketball coaches
Holy Cross Crusaders men's basketball coaches
Howard Bison men's basketball players
Mount St. Mary's Mountaineers men's basketball coaches
Old Dominion Monarchs men's basketball coaches
Pittsburgh Panthers men's basketball coaches
Sportspeople from Hampton, Virginia
William & Mary Tribe men's basketball coaches